Avenir Bennigsen (real name unknown, maybe Alexandr Petrovich Goglidze, 1912 - after 1996) was a Soviet intelligence agent, colonel, active during and after World War II.

Biography
His father was a Georgian, his mother was a Russian noble. In 1934 he has entered the intelligence service. Since 1937 he was illegally acting in Nazi Germany. In Germany, he was a tank commander taking part in the invasion of Poland and France, later Sturmbannführer (major) of SS. In 1941-1944 he worked at an aviation factory in Flossenbürg.

1945 - 1947 - colonel of NKVD, acting in Paris at repatriation commission. 
1948 - 1956 and 1963 — 1966 - intelligence agent in Belgium and France.

Later he lived in Israel and died there.

Literature
 (In Russian) А. Шнеер, «Из НКВД в СС и обратно: из рассказов штурмбаннфюрера»[1] Москва, Параллели, 2005, 184 станицы, тираж: 1000 экз., формат: 60х90 1/16, вес: 195 гр., 

1990s deaths
Soviet spies
NKVD officers
Recipients of the Iron Cross (1939)
1912 births
Year of death missing